The 2011 Nigerian Senate election in Benue State was held on April 9, 2011, to elect members of the Nigerian Senate to represent Benue State. Barnabas Andyar Gemade representing Benue North East and David Mark representing Benue South won on the platform of Peoples Democratic Party, while George Akume representing Benue North West won on the platform of Action Congress of Nigeria.

Overview

Summary

Results

Benue North East 
Peoples Democratic Party candidate Barnabas Andyar Gemade won the election, defeating other party candidates.

Benue South 
Peoples Democratic Party candidate David Mark won the election, defeating other party candidates.

Benue North West 
Action Congress of Nigeria candidate George Akume won the election, defeating other party candidates.

References 

Benue State senatorial elections
Benue State senatorial elections
Benue State Senate elections